Raphitoma ferrierii is an extinct species of sea snail, a marine gastropod mollusk in the family Raphitomidae.

Description
The length of the shell reaches 18.5 mm, its diameter 6.5 mm.

Distribution
Fossils of this marine species were found in Early-Middle Pliocene strata in Tuscany, Italy

References

ferrierii
Gastropods described in 2006